The 2022–23 Deutsche Eishockey Liga season is the 29th season since the founding of the Deutsche Eishockey Liga. It started on 15 September 2022.

The season is contested by 15 teams, as the 2021–22 DEL2 champion, Löwen Frankfurt, received a license, replacing the Krefeld Pinguine, who were relegated to the DEL2

Teams

Regular season

Standings

Results

Playoffs
The playoffs will be held between 7 March and 27 April 2023.

Bracket

Pre-playoffs
The pre-playoffs were played between 7 and 10 March 2023 in a best-of-three mode.

Düsseldorfer EG vs Löwen Frankfurt

Fischtown Pinguins vs Nürnberg Ice Tigers

Quarterfinals
The quarterfinals will be played between 14 and 28 March 2023 in a best-of-seven mode.

EHC Red Bull München vs Fischtown Pinguins

ERC Ingolstadt vs Düsseldorfer EG

Adler Mannheim vs Kölner Haie

Straubing Tigers vs Grizzlys Wolfsburg

Semifinals
The quarterfinals will be played between 31 March and 12 April 2023 in a best-of-seven mode.

WQF1 vs WQF2

WQF3 vs WQF4

Final
The final will be played between 14 and 27 April 2023 in a best-of-seven mode.

Statistics

Scoring leaders
List shows the top skaters sorted by points, then goals.

Leading goaltenders
Only the top five goaltenders, based on save percentage, who have played at least 40% of their team's minutes, are included in this list.

Awards
The awards were announced on 11 March 2023.

References

External links
Official website

2022-23
DEL
DEL